Lesotho men's national softball team is the national team for Lesotho. The team competed at the 2000 ISF Men's World Championship in East London, South Africa where they finished sixteenth.

References

Men's national softball teams
National sports teams of Lesotho
Men's sport in Lesotho
Softball in Lesotho